Vediq (also Romanized as Vedīq) is a village in Dizmar-e Gharbi Rural District, Siah Rud District, Jolfa County, East Azerbaijan Province, Iran. At the 2006 census, its population was 43, in 19 families.

References 

Populated places in Jolfa County